Minister of Capital Investments is the person in charge of the Ministry of Capital Investments of Montenegro (Ministarstvo kapitalnih investicija). Ministry of Capital Investments was formed in December 2020 with reorganization of the Ministry of Transportation and Maritime Affairs and Montenegrin Ministry of Economy (Ministarstvo Ekonomije Crne Gore).

Government Ministers, since 2006

References

Government of Montenegro